St James Church, Muswell Hill, is a large Anglican church in London, known as "the Church on the Hill".

History
The original building was consecrated in 1842, designed by Samuel Angell. In 1874, the church was extended. A new church was designed by J. S. Alder in 1898, with the foundation stone for the current building being laid in 1900. The completed church was consecrated by the Bishop of London (Rev. Arthur Winnington-Ingram) on 30 June 1902.

The building was gutted by World War II bombing, and the restored church was rededicated in 1952. The church centre's foundation stone was laid on 20 May 1994 and can be viewed in the bookshop.

The Church spire was completed in 1910; the site of the church itself is at over 300 feet above sea level. With its tall tower and spire, the church stands at 179 feet tall.

A church primary school was completed nearby in 1850; its later replacement is sited on Woodside Ave.

Vicars

18421846 John Jackson (later bishop of London) 
18461876 James Browell
18761894 Ernest Peter Cachemaille
18941912 James Shearer Whichelow
19121931 Arthur Mercer
19311958 Ernest Ernold Dunn (Prebendary of St Pauls)
19581966 Norman Harold Bainbridge
19671977 William Sidney Allam (Prebendary of St Pauls)
19781992 Michael Bunker (Prebendary of St Pauls)
19932007 Alex Ross
20082013 Kim Swithinbank 
2014present Christopher Green

References

External links

Muswell Hill
Diocese of London
Rebuilt churches in the United Kingdom
Muswell Hill
20th-century Church of England church buildings
Muswell Hill